Peter Hobley Davison OBE (10 September 1926 – 16 August 2022) was a British professor of English and an authority on the life and works of George Orwell.

Background
Born in Newcastle upon Tyne on 10 September 1926, he worked in the Crown Film Unit and served in the Navy during the Second World War. He gained his bachelor's degree through correspondence and also had a master's degree in bibliography and palaeography.

Career
After time as a Fellow at the Shakespeare Institute, a lecturer at the University of Sydney, and as lecturer and senior lecturer at Birmingham University, he was appointed Professor of English at Saint David's University College (later University of Wales Trinity Saint David) and then at the University of Kent, De Montfort University, Leicester. He was later an emeritus professor of English at Glyndŵr University.

In 1992, he was president of the Bibliographical Society and edited its journal, The Library, for 12 years. He received the Society's Gold Medal in 2003. From 1991 to 2005 he was Secretary of the Economic and Social Research Council in London. Between 1986 and 1998 he was also Honorary Steward of Westminster Abbey.

In 1998, assisted by his wife, Sheila Davison, and Ian Angus he edited the 20-volume The Complete Works of George Orwell (Secker & Warburg, 1998).

In 2012 Davison announced the launch of The Orwell Society and was made an honorary founding member the following year.  In 2013, he edited Orwell's Diaries and Orwell: A Life in Letters.

Personal life
Davison married Sheila Bethel in 1949. They had three children and remained together until her death in 2017. He died at a hospital in Swindon on 16 August 2022, at the age of 95.

Publications
George Orwell: A Literary Life (Palgrave Macmillan, 1996)
The Complete Works of George Orwell (Secker & Warburg, 1998) 
The Lost Orwell (Timewell Press, 2007) 
George Orwell: A Life in Letters (Penguin, 2011)

References

1926 births
2022 deaths
20th-century biographers
21st-century biographers
Academics of De Montfort University
Academics of the University of Birmingham
Academics of the University of Wales Trinity Saint David
British academics of English literature
English biographers
English expatriates in Australia
George Orwell
Officers of the Order of the British Empire
People from Newcastle upon Tyne
Royal Navy personnel of World War II
Academic staff of the University of Sydney